Nationality may refer to:

 Civic nationality, legal affiliation with a state, through citizenship
 Multiple nationality, legal affiliation with more than one civic nationality, or citizenship
 Nationality law, law that regulates issues related to civic nationality, or citizenship
 Ethnic nationality, affiliation with an ethnic group, through the concept of an ethnic nation   
 Nationality in ethnopolitics, affiliation of an ethnic nationality with a particular ethnopolitical program 
 Nationality in religious nationalism, a specific concept of nationality, in religious nationalism

See also
 Nation (disambiguation)